Crystal Hill is an ice-free hill,  high, forming the summit of a headland between Bald Head and Camp Hill on the south side of the Trinity Peninsula. It was so named by the Falkland Islands Dependencies Survey because crystals were collected at the foot of the hill in 1945 and 1946.

References
 

Hills of Trinity Peninsula